Sorsogon City, officially the City of Sorsogon (Waray Sorsogon: Syudad san Sorsogon;), is a 3rd class component city and capital of the province of Sorsogon, Philippines. According to the 2020 census, it has a population of 182,237 people.

The component city was established on the year of 2000, from the merger of Bacon and Sorsogon municipalities. The city's total population spread across 64 barangays.

It serves a trans-shipment point from the Visayas and Mindanao provinces and is dubbed as the "Gateway to Southern Philippines". Sorsogon City is one of the region's leading cities in urbanization and the most promising city in terms of development.

History
Evidence of human habitation come from 3,000-year-old remains in a cave in Bacon and ancient burial sites dug upstream of Sorsogon rivers. Spanish missionaries came upon settlements in both sites when they arrived in the 1600s. Moro pirates had already frequented the territorial waters before the arrival of the Spanish missions.

Bacon was established as a visita of Casiguran while Sorsogon, originally in Sitio Pocdol in Capuy, was then established as a visita of Bacon. Sorsogon then became an independent, full-fledged parish in 1628 due to an increase in population. The two parishes later became civilian political units.

The Pueblo Civil de Bacon was established in 1754, with Juan Elias as its first gobernadorcillo. Sorsogon became an independent pueblo in 1864. Both Bacon and Sorsogon were under the territorial jurisdiction of the province of Albay until the establishment of the independent province of Sorsogon on October 17, 1894.

In 1951, Sorsogon was made the center of the episcopal see of the then newly established Roman Catholic Diocese of Sorsogon comprising the Sorsogon and Masbate provinces, with the Saints Peter and Paul Parish Church in the town of Sorsogon as the designated cathedral.

Cityhood

Sorsogon City was created by virtue of Republic Act No. 8806 which was enacted on August 16, 2000 and ratified in December 2000.

Geography
It is at the southernmost tip of the Bicol Peninsula and of Luzon Island. The city is bounded by Castilla in the west, Manito in the northwest, Albay Gulf in the north, Prieto Diaz in the east, Gubat in the southeast, Casiguran in the southwest, and Sorsogon Bay in the south. Sorsogon is characterized by an irregular topography; mountain ranges on the north-west, sloping uplands on the central part of the city, plain areas southwestern and central north and southeast portion, and marshlands on the southeast deltas. It is also surrounded by water, with Sorsogon Bay to the west Albay Gulf to the northeast, and Philippine Sea in the east.

The 2015 Census puts the city's population at 168,110 with an annual growth rate of 0.84%. Sorsogon City ranked as the 3rd largest city in terms of population in the Bicol region. The only city in the province of Sorsogon, Sorsogon City is the largest in terms of land area in the Bicol region.

The Pan-Philippine Highway which runs from northwest to southeast through the city, connects Sorsogon City to the municipalities of Castilla, Pilar, in the northwest towards Daraga, Legazpi City, Naga City and the rest of Luzon. It also connects to the municipalities of Gubat, Casiguran and the rest of the second district municipalities of the province of Sorsogon in the southeast.

Barangays

Climate

Sorsogon City features a tropical rainforest climate with copious amount of rainfall throughout the course of the year. There is no pronounced dry season, but it has very pronounced maximum rain from November to January with December as the wettest month of the year, experiencing 23 days of rain. Temperature is constant throughout the year.

Demographics

Demographic statistics:
Annual Growth Rate 1.69% for the period 2000 – 2007
Population Growth Rate – 2.15% (1995–2000)
Population Density - 627 persons per square kilometer
Total Number of Households 30,290
Male Population - 77,117
Female Population - 74,337
Religion – 95% Roman Catholic
Labor Force – 56% of the total population, 1/4 of the over-15 years old is, at least, high-school graduate, 15% of the total workforce have college-level education
Student Population - 15,323
Voting Age Population - 83,123

Economy

Sorsogon City is the economic center of Sorsogon Province and a hub of trade and commerce.  As one of the major cities in the Bicol Region, only after Naga City, Camarines Sur and Legazpi City in Albay, many people in Sorsogon City and its nearby municipalities and provinces as far as Northern Samar,  Samar and Masbate visit the city during the day. This causes the city's daytime population to rise and cause traffic to parts of the city, especially the downtown area. The city is a vital financial center housing numerous banks, non-bank financial institutions, manufacturing corporation and offices of major government departments and agencies. Although Sorsogon City does not have significant manufacturing industries, its dynamic service and agricultural sectors drive the economy forward.

Sorsogon City is gradually becoming a major investment hub and is considered one of the emerging cities for doing business in the country. Investors in banking, real estate, retail, manufacturing and other business and industrial enterprises are similarly drawn to the city because of its rapid advancements of government infrastructure and business-friendly environment.

Banking 
As of December 31, 2021, there are 27 banking offices operating in the city that offers banking services to businesses and residents according to Philippine Deposit Insurance Corporation. Sorsogon is the third city in Bicol Region, after Legazpi and Naga with a highest total deposits amounting to Php 17,699,836 from 224,682 accounts.

Retail 

The city is home to a number of retail establishments. There were 3,475 business establishments in Sorsogon City as of 2022. There are 3 major shopping malls in the City of Sorsogon namely, SM Supermalls, Gaisano Capital and Citymall. It also attracted other local and national retail chains including  Puregold, SM Savemore, Primark Town Center with 3 community malls, 7-Eleven, Mr. DIY, Citi Hardware, Wilcon Depot, Centro Department Stores and LCC.

Meanwhile, SM City Sorsogon, the fourth SM Supermall in Bicol and the 81st in the Philippines, is located beside the Sorsogon Integrated Terminal Exchange (SITEX) and opened on October 28, 2022.  The mall is located along Maharlika Highway, Balogo, East District in Sorsogon City. SM City Sorsogon spans 40,000 square meters of gross floor area, providing two levels of shopping, dining, and entertainment destinations that will further boost the city and province’s socioeconomic, cultural, and leisure activities. Its shops will be led by SM Store, SM Supermarket, Watsons, Miniso, Surplus Shop, Ace Hardware, Sports Central, SM Appliance, Banco de Oro, Levi’s, and Crocs.Among its amenities are three SM Cinemas, a food court, Cyberzone, wellness and services hubs, and amusement, leisure, and hobbies shops. 
Its parking space has more than 700 slots as well as a public transport terminal.

Housing 

As Sorsogon City is strategically located at the southernmost tip of the island of Luzon and considered one of the emerging city in the Philippines. The housing sector is starting to flourish with the entry of local and national real estate developers. These include the Villar-owned Camella Sorsogon a wide selection of beautiful Italian-Mediterranean-inspired house models for you to choose from. The contemporary architectural design, materials and finishing of each house are intended to complement the nostalgic environment that feels comfortable, homey and yet familiar. It is located in Maharlika Highway, Barangay Cabid-an, Sorsogon City.

Lumina Homes Sorsogon the affordable housing arm of Villar-owned Vista Land set their footprint in the city located at Brgy. Macabog, West District, Sorsogon City. Lumina communities come complete with a covered basketball court, mini gardens, and playground, guarded entrance with CCTV, and shuttle service. More importantly, they are close to major thoroughfares and business centers. 
The real estate arm of LKY Group,  San Fernando Estates envisioned to be the first high end residences in the city located at Sitio Baribag, Bibincahan, Sorsogon City. Imperial Ridgeview of Imperial Homes Corporation invested in land and housing development and the construction and sale of housing units. It is located in Pangpang, Sorsogon City.

The City Government of Sorsogon aims to provide housing and a home to informal settlers in the city thru Mayor Ester Hamor's 10+1 Agenda, Taas-Noo Ciudadano Ako Program - Mass Housing Program, a priority program of Mayor Hamor thru the construction of the Sirangan Tenements and Sampaloc Tenements - a three building  3-storey socialized housing building for informal settler families around the barangays covering the inner Sorsogon Bay Area in Sorsogon City.

Bypass roads 
 
To decongest the Pan-Philippine Highway and to spur new developments outside the downtown area, two bypass roads were constructed in Sorsogon City, (1) the 7.654 kilometer Salvador Escudero III Diversion Road traversing Barangay Pangpang, Macabog, San Juan, Bibincahan and exits Brgy. Cabid-an, Sorsogon City and (2) the latest coastal road with a view of the Sorsogon Coastline, the 5.52 kilometer Sorsogon City Coastal Road, a four-lanes, consisting of rock causeways and three bridges traversing several barangays of Sirangan, Sampaloc, Balogo, Pangpang, Tugos, Cambulaga, and Talisay in Sorsogon City. It may be considered among the grandest of the Build-Build-Build projects in Bicol Region undertaken by DPWH Regional Office 5 and Sorsogon First District Engineering Office thru the effort of Senator Francis "Chiz" Escudero. Other than decongesting the heavy traffic in the main thoroughfare of Sorsogon City, this road was built to provide protection to the surrounding areas from storm surges especially the Bicol Region is among the most frequent path of typhoons entering the Philippine area of responsibility.

Tourism 
As a gateway to the Visayas and Mindanao, tourism plays a major part as a catalyst in contributing to Sorsogon City's economy. There are myriad of selections of attractions in the city that tourists can visit.
Here are the Sorsogon City’s point of interests, destinations, and attractions:

Natural areas
Paguriran Island and Lagoon
Halabang Baybay Beach 
Tolong Gapo Beach 
Libanon Black Sand Beach
Pagol Beach 
Buhatan River Tour and Firefly Watching
Busay Falls

Historical locations
Sorsogon Provincial Capitol Building (originally Constructed dated 1904)
Dr. Jose Rizal Monument
Annunciation Parish Church in Bacon (406 years as of 2022)
Sts. Peter and Paul Cathedral

Library and Museums
Museo Sorsogon
Museo ng Gerilya ng Sorsogon (Gabaldon Building, Sorsogon East Central School)
 Sorsogon State University Library 

Parks and Sceneries
Pepita Park 
Sorsogon Capitol Park 
Sorsogon Rompeolas Park
Sorsogon Coastal Road

Sports Venues
 Sorsogon Sports Complex
 Sorsogon Provincial Gymnasium
 Sorsogon Lawn Tennis Center

Government
The city's local government is headed by a mayor elected by popular vote. The Vice Mayor serves as the presiding officer of the Sangguniang Panlungsod (city council), with 12 Councilors elected by popular vote as its members. The Sangguniang Panlungsod serves as the city's legislative body and its role is to enact ordinances, approve resolutions, appropriate funds for the general welfare of the city and its inhabitants. Both the council members and the mayor serve three-year terms; and eligible for re-election for two more three-year terms.

Infrastructure

In order to spur development in the city, The Toll Regulatory Board declared Toll Road 5 the extension of South Luzon Expressway. A 420-kilometer, four lane expressway starting from the terminal point of the now under construction SLEX Toll Road 4 at Barangay Mayao, Lucena City in Quezon to Matnog, Sorsogon, near the Matnog Ferry Terminal. On August 25, 2020, San Miguel Corporation announced that they will invest the project which will reduce travel time from Lucena to Matnog from 9 hours to 5.5 hours.

The Sorsogon Sports Complex (Formerly known as the Balogo Sports Complex) is a complex of sport facilities located at Brgy. Balogo and its still under rehabilitation. It is scheduled to host the Palarong Bicol, PRISAA National Games 2023 and 2023 Palarong Pambansa. Mohri & P.A. Associates are the architecture of that project with the total area of 56,218 sq. m. and a 4-storey Roman Colosseum-inspired stadium.

The Sorsogon City Convention Center (SCCC) can now host big events such as conventions, exhibits, trainings and competitions. The 4,099 square meters facility can accommodate up to 2,500 spectators thus, boosting socio economic activities in the province of Sorsogon. It is envisioned to be the premier venue for local and international meetings, social and corporate events. It is located in City Hall Complex, Brgy. Cabid-an, Sorsogon City adjacent to Sorsogon Cultural Center for the Arts.

The Sorsogon Cultural Center for the Arts is a state-of-the-art facility in the City of Sorsogon for audio and visual presentations and will house exhibit rooms and halls for shows and performances as well as offices. It was designed to be the country’s second main arts facility next to the Cultural Center of the Philippines (CCP),The 2,638-square meter edifice features an outdoor lobby, lounge lobby, vestibule, spectators’ area, orchestra pit, performance stage, and a seating capacity of 338 on the ground floor and 177 on the mid-floor level. The Sorsogon Cultural Center for the Arts will be a grand place to cover film and broadcast arts, as well as literary and visual arts. Its presence will encourage local artists to pursue their passion through numerous workshops, seminars, anthologies, exhibits, symposia, competitions, and awards. It will establish good network among local and regional artists as well as cultural workers in the country. It will also be a venue for local communities for organizing their leisure, providing opportunities for self-expression, initiatives and cultural education.

The City Government of Sorsogon started to construct the 4-Level Sorsogon City Public Parking aims to address the roadside parking issues and ease traffic congestion. Due to the increasing number of motor vehicles plying the city roads and address the worsening traffic congestions in the central business district area in Rizal and Magsaysay Streets. It will also cater to the parking needs of marketgoers and businesses since it is well within the public market area. It is located in the area formerly Plaza Bonifacio, Brgy. Sirangan, Sorsogon City.

Festivals

Pili Festival – This is Sorsogon City’s major festival in honor of the patron saints of the city, Sts. Peter and Paul. The Pili tree (and nut) is indigenous to the province and is known for its various practical, economic and nutritional applications. This festival aims to emphasize its importance, and heightens awareness of the pili. The fiesta’s big attraction is the street dance in which beautifully costumed dancers depict the many uses of the tree. This is celebrated every last week of June (June 29) and usually a week-long celebration (June 19 to 29).

Transportation

Land 
Sorsogon City is accessible by land transport.

Much of the city's population rely on public transportation such as tricycles and jeeps to get around the city. The city boasts its color-coded public transportation system which it has pioneered in the region. All tricycles have its own color code depending on the district, zone or route that it is serving.
Inter-town trips are served by the new airconditioned e-jeepneys while inter-provincial trips are served by the UV Express Vans and number of bus companies operating provincial and regional routes, with the modern Sorsogon Integrated Terminal Exchange (SITEX) serving as the terminus.

Air 
The city is 1-hour away from the Bicol International Airport located in Daraga, Albay.

Notable personalities

Aldin Ayo - a former Sorsogon City's councilor, had coaching stints with Letran Knights, De La Salle's Green Archers, UST's Growling Tigers to name a few.
Eddie Garcia – Film actor and director
Eugenia Apostol - one of the founders of Philippine Daily Inquirer
Francis "Chiz" G. Escudero – former congressman (1998-2007) of Soesogon's First District, former Sorsogon governor (2019-2022), served 3 terms as a senator (2007-2019) and currently serving as a senator. 
Jessie Dellosa - former Armed Forces of the Philippines Chief of Staff. He was born in the former town of Bacon, now a district in the city.
Jorge Barlin – First Filipino and Bikolano Bishop and was assigned parish priest and Vicar Forane of Sorsogon from 1887 to 1906
Loida Nicolas Lewis – chairwoman and chief executive officer of TLC Beatrice, LLC, the Lewis Family investment firm and is also chairman and CEO of TLC Beatrice (China) and TLC Beatrice Foods (Philippines).
Mary Walter – actress, whose career spanned through several decades. She was born in Bacon.
Vicente Peralta - the late solon represented the 2nd district of Sorsogon in congress from 1953 to 1968. He's a skilled orator and was tagged as one of the Ten Most Outstanding Congressmen by Philippine Free Press and Congressional Press Club. A district hospital and a city street was named after him.

Sister cities

Local
  Legazpi

International
  Ceuta, Spain
  Sterling Heights, Michigan, United States

References

External links

 [ Philippine Standard Geographic Code]
 Philippine Census Information
 Local Governance Performance Management System

 
1895 establishments in the Philippines
Cities in the Bicol Region
Populated places established in 1895
Populated places in Sorsogon
Provincial capitals of the Philippines
Component cities in the Philippines